René I de Rohan, (1516–1552) 18th Viscount of Rohan, Viscount and Prince de Léon, and Marquis de Blain  married Isabella of Navarre daughter of jure uxoris King John III of Navarre and Catherine of Navarre, Queen of Navarre.

Life
René I was the son of Pierre II de Rohan and Anne de Rohan, who upon her death transmitted the titles of her brother, Jacques de Rohan, who died without heirs.

Queen Margaret of Navarre, sister of Francis I of France served as Guardian of René I de Rohan, and arranged for René I de Rohan to marry her sister-in-law Isabella. This introduced Protestantism into the House of Rohan. A family who would fight on Protestant side in the Huguenot rebellions.

René I de Rohan died in 1552 fighting on the German frontier during the Siege of Metz.

Children
René I de Rohan and Isabella of Navarre had:

 Françoise de Rohan, married to Jacques de Savoie, duc de Nemours
 Louis de Rohan, seigneur de Gié
 Henri I, Viscount of Rohan, 19th Viscount of Rohan, married Françoise of Tournemine
 Jean de Rohan, married Diane of Barbançon
 René II, de Rohan, 20th Viscount of Rohan, married Catherine of Parthenay

References

Sources

Rene 01 de Rohan
Rene 01 de Rohan
1516 births
1552 deaths